Lough Cutra (formerly Lough Cooter) is a lake in County Galway, Ireland located beside Lough Cutra Castle. It is the site of a Special Area of Conservation.

Ardamullivan Castle lies 2 km (1 mile) to the southwest.

See also 
 List of loughs in Ireland

References 

Cutra